was a Japanese film critic and film theorist. Born in Saitama Prefecture, he attended the Kobe University of Commerce (the precursor to Kobe University) but left before graduating. In 1935 he helped found the film dojinshi Eiga shūdan (Film Collective). Writing from a left-wing perspective, he was a strong advocate of the realistic aspects of cinema and thus a champion of documentary film. He was also the first in Japan to pursue an extensive study of animated film. After World War II, he became the publisher of the journals Eiga bunka (Film Culture) and Eizō bunka (Image Culture). In his later years, he penned a study of the novelist Naoya Shiga. He published over 27 books during his career. Underlining how Imamura was a unique figure in the history of Japanese film theory, Heiichi Sugiyama subtitled his autobiography of Imamura, "A solitary and original critic of the image".

Anime directors such as Isao Takahata have expressed their debt to Imamura and Studio Ghibli has republished his book on animation, Manga eigaron.

Selected publications

Notes

References
Amit, Rea (2019)."What Is Japanese Cinema?: Imamura Taihei’s Wartime Theory of Japanese Film, Tradition, and Art," Positions: Asia Critique27.4 (November 2019):pp.597-621.   
Driscoll, Mark (2002). "From Kino-Eye to Anime-eye/ai: The Filmed and the Animated in Imamura Taihei's Media Theory," Japan Forum 14.2 (September 2002): pp. 269–296.

Japanese film critics
Film theorists
1911 births
1986 deaths